FC Tskhumi Sokhumi is a Georgian association football club, currently playing in Regionuli Liga East, the fifth tier of the Georgian league system. 

The club was based in Sokhumi in 1990–1993 and following the War in Abkhazia (1992–1993) was re-founded by an internally displaced person from Abkhazia in Tbilisi.

History
In 1990, most Georgian clubs including FC Dinamo Tbilisi withdrew from the Soviet League system and established the Georgian national league as the Umaglesi Liga. The club's predecessor, FC Dinamo Sokhumi, refused to join it and continued to play in the Soviet First League for the next two seasons. Therefore, Tskhumi was formed to represent Sokhumi in Umaglesi Liga. Star players Gocha Gogrichiani and Giorgi Chikhradze joined from Dinamo. The first president was Guram Gabiskiria.

The team started successfully, reaching the Georgian Cup finals twice in 1990 and 1991 where they lost respectively to Guria Lanchkhuti and Dinamo Tbilisi. In 1991–1992 Tskhumi finished in 2nd place in the league, but due to the war in Abkhazia had to cease their participation in the championship along with all other clubs from the region.  

Overall Tskhumi spent four full seasons in Umaglesi Liga.  

Between 1993 and 1999 FC Tskhumi was dissolved. The club restored their participation in the Georgian league and won Liga 3 in 2014 by a large margin. 

Since then Tskhumi have played in lower divisions.

Name
Tskhumi is an old Georgian historical name for the capital of Abkhazia used prior to the 16th century instead of its current form.

Stadium
The team has taken Shromiti Rezervebi stadium on lease. It has not gotten its own stadium and training base yet.

Football kits and sponsors

Current squad
As of 31 March 2018 
 Rati Chitadze 
 Levan Khidasheli 
 Giorgi Koridze 
 Jaba Sulakvelidze 
 Giorgi Jalaghonia 
 Alexander Rostiashvili 
 Luka Sabanadze 
 Lash Ghonghadze 
 Beka Karsimashvili 

 Gaga Kukhianidze 
 Rezi Karanadze 

 Giorgi Gabunia 
 Levan Kokaia  
 Beka Ivanishvili 
 Nika Sadghobelashvili 
 Lasha Zghenti 
 Luka Sigua
 Nika Kobauri 
 Otar Kupatadze 
 valeri Tsaava 
 David Nadiradze 
 Lekso Tkachovi 
 Irakli Intskirveli

Personnel

Current technical staff

Last updated: 2 April 2018

Management

Last updated: 11 March 2018

Honours
Georgian Umaglesi Liga
 Silver Medal winner: 1991–1992
Georgian Cup
 Runner-up: 1990, 1992
Meore Liga
 Winner: 2014–15

Top goal scorers

Managerial history
All managers of FC Tskhumi Sokhumi

Seasons

Key

 P = Played
 W = Games won
 D = Games drawn
 L = Games lost
 F = Goals for
 A = Goals against
 Pts = Points
 Pos = Final position

 ERL = Erovnuli Liga
 STL = Soviet Top League
 SFL = Soviet First League

R1 = First round
R2 = Second round
R3 = Third round
QF = Quarter-finals
SF = Semi-finals
GS = Group stage
QR1 = First Qualifying Round
QR2 = Second Qualifying Round
QR3 = Third Qualifying Round

Georgia

References

External links
 Official website 

Tskhumi Sokhumi
Association football clubs established in 1990
Football in Abkhazia
1990 establishments in Georgia (country)
Sport in Sukhumi